Billingshurst Football Club is a football club based in Billingshurst, West Sussex, England.

History
The club was established in 1891, and later joined the West Sussex League. They won the Division Two title in 1972–73 and went on to win Division One the following season. Following relegation the club won the Tony Kopp Cup and the Division Three North in 1979–80 and then Division Two North in 1982–83. They were Division Two North champions again in 1992–93, before winning Division Three Central in 1998–99 and Division Two North in 2006–07.

In 2010–11 Billingshurst won the Centenary Cup with a 2–1 victory over Newtown Villa in the final. After winning the Malcolm Simmonds Memorial Cup and the Premier Division title in 2011–12, the club moved up to Division Three of the Sussex County League, which was renamed Division Two when the league became the Southern Combination in 2015. In 2015–16 they finished fifth, earning promotion to Division One.

Ground
The club moved to Jubilee Fields in 2006.

Honours
West Sussex League
Premier Division champions 2011–12
Division One champions 1973–74
Division Two champions 1972–73
Division Two North champions 1982–83, 1992–93, 2006–07
Division Three North champions 1979–80
Division Three Central champions 1998–99
Centenary Cup winners 2010–11
Malcolm Simmonds Memorial Cup winners 2011–12
Tony Kopp Cup winners 1979–80, 2002–03
Chichester Charity Cup
Winners 1972–73, 1980–81

References

External links
Official website

1891 establishments in England
Association football clubs established in 1891
Football clubs in England
Football clubs in West Sussex
West Sussex Football League
Southern Combination Football League